Jack Nock (1899 – after 1929) was an English professional footballer who played as a forward. He played in the Football League for Cardiff City and Wrexham and had an extensive career in wartime and non-league football.

Career
After playing for non-league club Stourbridge, Nock signed for Millwall in October 1915. He remained with the club until 1919, making over 50 appearances in wartime competitions, before joining Leicester Fosse. As well as appearing in regional league matches for Fosse, he scored the last goal for the side before they became known as Leicester City during a 1–1 draw with a British Expeditionary Force XI. However, he was not offered a contract by the club when the Football League resumed after the hostilities. He joined Southern Football League side Merthyr Town, scoring 9 times in 26 appearances during the 1919–20 season.

He joined Nuneaton Town in 1920, where he was a regular in the first team for over a year. He had brief spells with Tamworth Castle and Cradley Heath in 1922 before returning to the Football League with Cardiff City. He made his debut for the club in a 1–1 draw with Sheffield United the following month but made just two further appearances in the following 18 months. In 1924, he joined Wrexham along with Cardiff teammate Jimmy Jones. He made his debut for the club in a 1–1 draw with Walsall before scoring his first goals with a brace during a 3–1 victory over Durham City in their following home match.

He left Wrexham in 1926, later playing for Burton United, Worcester City, Flint Town United and Oswestry Town.

References

1899 births
Date of death missing
English footballers
People from Warley, West Midlands
Stourbridge F.C. players
Millwall F.C. players
Leicester City F.C. players
Merthyr Town F.C. players
Nuneaton Borough F.C. players
Tamworth F.C. players
Cradley Heath F.C. players
Cardiff City F.C. players
Wrexham A.F.C. players
Burton United F.C. players
Worcester City F.C. players
Flint Town United F.C. players
Oswestry Town F.C. players
English Football League players
Association football forwards